John C. Fremont Branch Library is a branch library of the Los Angeles Public Library in Los Angeles, California. It is adjacent to the Hancock Park district. It was built in 1927 based on a Mediterranean Revival design by architect Merl L. Barker.

In 1987, the Fremont Branch and several other branch libraries in Los Angeles were added to the National Register of Historic Places as part of a thematic group submission. The application noted that the branch libraries had been constructed in a variety of period revival styles to house the initial branch library system of the City of Los Angeles.

The current facility began construction on December 26, 1926 and was completed in May 1927. The library opened on June 1, 1927. The library closed in 1990 because its masonry was not reinforced and the building was not in compliance with seismic safety codes. The library operated from a temporary location until February 1996. The library re-opened in its current location on March 26, 1996. The in-compliance library gained air conditioning, a meeting room, a small parking lot, wiring for computer and internet usage, and access for disabled persons.

See also

List of Registered Historic Places in Los Angeles
Los Angeles Public Library

References

External links
 John C. Fremont Branch Library - Los Angeles Public Library
 John C. Fremont Branch Library History, 1949–1959
 Grand opening celebration for the John C. Fremont Branch, Mar. 25, 1996
 60th anniversary celebration, John C. Fremont branch, 1987

Library buildings completed in 1927
Libraries in Los Angeles
Libraries on the National Register of Historic Places in Los Angeles
Mediterranean Revival architecture in California
Hancock Park, Los Angeles